The men's sprint competition at the 2022 UEC European Track Championships was held on 13 and 14 August 2022.

Results

Qualifying
The top 10 riders qualified for the 1/8 finals, 11th to 22nd places qualified for the 1/16 finals.

1/16 finals
Heat winners advanced to the 1/8 finals.

1/8 finals
Heat winners advanced to the quarterfinals.

Quarterfinals
Matches are extended to a best-of-three format hereon; winners proceed to the semifinals.

Semifinals
Winners proceed to the gold medal final; losers proceed to the bronze medal final.

Finals

References

Men's sprint
European Track Championships – Men's sprint